Mount Siyeh, with a height of , is the fifth tallest and one of six peaks over  in Glacier National Park, Montana, United States. Mount Siyeh was named after a Blackfeet Indian, Sai-yeh, whose name means "Crazy Dog" or "Mad Wolf."

Mount Siyeh stands about two miles east of the Continental Divide, within the watershed of the Saint Mary River, which drains into the Saskatchewan River, and ultimately into Hudson Bay.

Mount Siyeh is rather easily accessible from a variety of different routes.  It can be ascended via a long scree scramble from the Preston Park area, or from Piegan Pass via Cataract Mountain.  The summit can also be reached via a long hiking/mountaineering route dubbed the "Skyline Experience"; this route starts from the Many Glacier Hotel and involves  ridge walk and includes the summits of Wynn Mountain and Cracker Peak before reaching the top of Siyeh.

Route Descriptions can be found on Summitpost or in A Climbers Guide to Glacier National Park.

Geology

Like other mountains in Glacier National Park, it is composed of sedimentary rock laid down during the Precambrian to Jurassic periods.

Climate
Based on the Köppen climate classification, it is located in an alpine subarctic climate zone with long, cold, snowy winters, and cool to warm summers. Winter temperatures can drop below −10 °F with wind chill factors below −30 °F.

Gallery

See also
 List of mountains and mountain ranges of Glacier National Park (U.S.)

References

Mountains of Glacier County, Montana
Mountains of Glacier National Park (U.S.)
Lewis Range
Mountains of Montana
North American 3000 m summits